Gustavia serrata is a species of woody plant in the family Lecythidaceae. It is found only in Ecuador and also Brazil. Its natural habitat is subtropical or tropical moist lowland forests.

References

serrata
Flora of Ecuador
Endangered plants
Taxonomy articles created by Polbot
Plants described in 1979